The 33rd Directors Guild of America Awards, honoring the outstanding directorial achievements in film and television in 1980, were presented on March 14, 1981 at the Beverly Hilton. The television nominees were announced on February 10, 1981.

Winners and nominees

Film

Television

Commercials

D.W. Griffith Award
 George Cukor

Frank Capra Achievement Award
 Francisco Day

Honorary Life Member
 Joseph L. Mankiewicz

References

External links
 

Directors Guild of America Awards
1980 film awards
1980 television awards
Direct
Direct
Directors
1981 in Los Angeles
March 1981 events in the United States